ARMD may refer to:

 Aeronautics Research Mission Directorate, within NASA
 Age-related macular degeneration, a type of vision loss
 ATAPI removable media device, a type of computing storage